Football Club Bekasi City or FC Bekasi City (previously known as Putra Sinar Giri, PSG Pati, AHHA PS Pati and Bekasi Football Club) is an Indonesian football club based in Bekasi, West Java that competes in Liga 2 and play their home match at Patriot Candrabhaga Stadium.

History
In 2014, Putra Ijen FC was established in Jember to participate in Liga 3 East Java.

In 2018, Putra Sinar Giri FC began participating in the East Java League 3 competition after buying a license from the club from Jember, Putra Ijen FC. PSG Gresik joined Liga 3 East Java in 2018 after buying license of Putra Ijen, club from Jember.
They won Liga 3 East Java for the first time in their history after beating Perseta Tulungagung 5–3 in penalty shootout.

In 2020, PSG Pati began participating in Liga 2 after Saiful Arifin bought the club's license from Gresik, Putra Sinar Giri FC.

In 2021, Atta Halilintar and Putra Siregar bought the majority stake of PSG Pati and changed the club's name to AHHA PS Pati.

In 2022, they decided to move their homebase from Pati to Bekasi and rebranded the club as Bekasi FC. For next season, Bekasi FC will use the Patriot Candrabhaga Stadium, hoping that the new homebase can make the club more successful.

However, the name Bekasi FC has been trademarked by a man named Erick, who promptly filed a lawsuit regarding the usage of the Bekasi FC brand. This forced the club to change their name once again into FC Bekasi City, which was ratified in the 2022 PSSI Ordinary Congress.

Naming history
 Putra Ijen (2014–2017)
 Putra Sinar Giri (2018–2019)
 PSG Pati (2020–2021)
 AHHA PS Pati (2021)
 Bekasi FC (2022)
FC Bekasi City (2022–present)

Players

Current squad

Naturalized player

Club officials

Club Official

Coaching staff

References

External links
 

Bekasi City
Bekasi City
Bekasi City
Bekasi City
Bekasi City